Edward Braithwaite may refer to:

 Edward Braithwaite (footballer) (1902–1990), English professional footballer
 Edward R. Braithwaite (1912–2016), Guyanese novelist